The Good Neighbor International Bridge, commonly known as the Stanton Street Bridge, is an international bridge connecting the United States-Mexico border cities of El Paso, Texas, and Ciudad Juárez, Chihuahua across the Rio Grande (Río Bravo). The bridge is also known as "Friendship Bridge", "Puente Río Bravo" and "Puente Ciudad Juárez-Stanton El Paso". The Good Neighbor International Bridge is a five lane bridge with 3 lanes for south bound traffic and one for Secure Electronic Network for Travelers Rapid Inspection northbound traffic. The U.S. side of the bridge is owned and operated by the City of El Paso.

Border crossing

The El Paso Stanton Street Port of Entry is limited to processing passenger vehicles that are enrolled in the SENTRI program.

References

International bridges in Texas
International bridges in Chihuahua (state)
Toll bridges in Texas
Bridges completed in 1998
Buildings and structures in El Paso, Texas
Transportation in El Paso, Texas
Road bridges in Texas
Toll bridges in Mexico
Transportation buildings and structures in El Paso County, Texas